MRR may stand for:

Finance
 Monthly Recurring Revenue, a returning monthly income stream
Market Reference Rate, e.g. Libor, Sofr

Literature and humanities
 Marcel Reich-Ranicki (1920–2013), German literary critic
 T.R.S. Broughton's (1900–1993), Magistrates of the Roman Republic

Media and pop culture
 Maximumrocknroll, a punk zine
 My Restaurant Rules, an Australian reality show

Online business
 Master Resell Right

Roads
In the names of roads, Middle Ring Road:
 Kuala Lumpur Middle Ring Road 1 (Malaysia), an urban and municipal main ring road in Kuala Lumpur
 Kuala Lumpur Middle Ring Road 2 (Malaysia), a ring road connecting neighborhoods near Kuala Lumpur and Selangor
 Middle Ring Road (Tianjin) (China), a system of roads partly encircling the core of Tianjin
 Birmingham Middle ring road (A4540) in England
 Mackay Ring Road, a proposed bypass route of Mackay

Science
 Mean reciprocal rank, a search quality measure in information retrieval
 Modulating retro-reflector, Free space optical communications technology

Sport
 Manchester Road Race, a Thanksgiving Day race held annually since 1927

Other
 José María Velasco Ibarra Airport (IATA code), an airport serving Macará, Ecuador
 Manila Railroad Company, former name of the Philippine National Railways
 Marine Raider Regiment, a special operations force of the United States Marine Corps
 Multi Rolle Radio (military), a modular radio set